East Thurlow Island is an island in British Columbia, Canada. It is part of the Discovery Islands, an archipelago between Vancouver Island and the mainland, whose waters connect the Strait of Georgia with Johnstone Strait and Queen Charlotte Strait. East Thurlow Island is located north of Vancouver Island, south of the mainland, northwest of Sonora Island, and east of West Thurlow Island.  East Thurlow Island is located within Electoral Area C of the Strathcona Regional District.

East Thurlow Island is separated from the mainland by Cordero Channel, from Vancouver Island by Johnstone Strait, and from Sonora Island by Nodales Channel. East and West Thurlow Islands are separated by Mayne Passage. The junction of Johnstone Strait and Discovery Passage lies just south of East Thurlow Island.

The island received its present name in 1792, after Edward Thurlow, 1st Baron Thurlow, Lord Chancellor of England. It was later discovered that Thurlow consists of two islands, and the narrow passage between them was given the name Blind Channel, perhaps because Captain Vancouver had missed it. We can forgive him this oversight, for many a mariner has since roared past and wondered later where the turn-off was. The channel was later renamed Mayne Passage, but the community which formed on the east end of West Thurlow Island was stuck with the name Blind Channel.

By 1910 Thurlow Island Lumber Company sawmill was established at Blind Channel, and the B. C. Directory lists nine lumbermen, six woodsmen, a blacksmith, and the mill manager. Notches in the sides of big old stumps scattered here and there remind us today of the labouring woodsmen with bucksaws, and the wide shoes of workhorses attest to the method of delivery to the mill. By 1918, the population had grown to 120, with Union Steam Ship freight and passenger boats stopping regularly, and for the next few decades the area bustled with activity. Blind Channel was home to a cannery, a shingle mill, and two large dance halls. The area continued to attract people looking for opportunity and an independent way of life, with the population peaking in the 1940s. In the 1930s, nine bootleggers were competing in Blind Channel at one point, mostly providing their own distillations with a very high alcohol content, if not the most refined flavour. For those who preferred the taste and guaranteed safety of the approved product, two of them specialized in government booze.

References

External links
Thurlow Islands, BCGIS

Islands of the Discovery Islands
South Coast of British Columbia